Kalantar is an Indian newspaper.

Kalantar may also refer to:
Kalantar, Ardabil, Iran
Kalantar, East Azerbaijan, Iran
Kalantar-e Olya, East Azerbaijan Province, Iran
Kalantar-e Sofla, East Azerbaijan Province, Iran
Kalantar, Kermanshah, Iran
Kalantar, North Khorasan, Iran
 Kalantar - a name of a kind of mail and plate armour
Kamyar Kalantar-Zadeh, American physician scientist in nephrology, nutrition, and epidemiology, Los Angeles, USA